Damnxanthodium is a monotypic genus of flowering plants in the family Asteraceae, containing the single species Damnxanthodium calvum. It is native to northern Mexico.

The plant was separated from the genus Perymenium. It was given the new genus name Damnxanthodium because it is difficult to distinguish from similar asters.

References

Monotypic Asteraceae genera
Heliantheae
Endemic flora of Mexico